Skalka is a Prague Metro station of Line A, located in Strašnice, Prague 10. It was opened on 4 July 1990 as the southern terminus of the extension of the line from Strašnická. On 27 May 2006 the line was extended to Depo Hostivař.

The station appears in the music video of One Armed Scissor a song by the band At The Drive In.

Gallery

References

Prague Metro stations
Railway stations opened in 1990
1990 establishments in Czechoslovakia
Prague 10
Railway stations in the Czech Republic opened in the 20th century